Naji is an Arabic given name and surname.

Naji may also refer to:

Naji, Kurdistan

See also
Nnaji, surname
Noji, surname